René Kunz (28 January 1911 – 18 September 2004) was a Swiss hurdler. He competed in the men's 110 metres hurdles at the 1936 Summer Olympics.

References

1911 births
2004 deaths
Athletes (track and field) at the 1936 Summer Olympics
Swiss male hurdlers
Olympic athletes of Switzerland
Place of birth missing